is a Japanese actor. He also worked as a narrator for documentaries, both on television and film. He trained as an actor at Bungakuza.

Selected filmography

Film

Television

Awards and honours
Awards

Honours

References

External links 
 Official profile 

1941 births
Living people
Japanese male film actors
Recipients of the Order of the Rising Sun, 4th class